Sandata is the lead single from Sarah Geronimo's album This 15 Me released on January 12, 2018. The song was written by Sarah Geronimo and Nica del Rosario who also wrote her previous hits Tala and Minamahal. During her set at the 2018 International Balloon and Music Festival in Pampanga on March 24, she performed the song for the very first time. CNN Philippines named the song as the "Best Filipino Song of 2018."

Release history
The song became available for pre-order on iTunes on January 10, 2018 and became the second most pre-ordered song during that time. On January 12, 2018, the day of its release, it went straight to number one on iTunes Philippines Songs Chart and stayed on top for four consecutive days. It also landed on Spotify Philippines Viral 50 at number 23. As of April 2018, the song has been played 800,000 times on Spotify, despite not having radio airplay and promotions.

Music video
The official lyric video of the song was published on Viva Records' official YouTube channel on January 20, 2018. Its music video is yet to be released. On June 27, 2018 Viva Records confirms on their Facebook page release the teaser of Music Video and release on July 1, 2018. The music video is Directed by Paul Basinilio and it premieres on MYX.

Live performances
Sarah Geronimo performed the song on International Balloon and Music Festival 2018, held in Lubao, Pampanga on March 24, 2018. She also performed the song on her 15th anniversary concert This 15 Me on April 14, 2018. On ASAP stage, she performed the song on May 27, 2018.

Reception
Sandata made it to the list "7 new local music releases to listen to" made by CNN Philippines, according to the article, "the song continues Sarah Geronimo's streak of Filipino dance pop anthems that began with Ikot-ikot then led us to Kilometro and Tala. While its production feels more low-key, less anthemic than past turns, Sandata makes up for it by finding Geronimo at her most polished and nuanced. This one's a grower, and as far as Filipino pop goes, it's a risk well-taken."

iTunes Charts

References

Sarah Geronimo songs
2018 singles
2017 songs
Tagalog-language songs